Dasient was an internet security company headquartered in Sunnyvale, California. It was founded in 2008  and launched its first product in June 2009.
Dasient was acquired by Twitter in January 2012.

Products
Dasient provides cloud-based anti-malware services for protecting businesses against web-based malware and malvertising.

Dasient's Web Malware Analysis Platform uses a dynamic, behavioral-based engine - based on sophisticated algorithms and anomaly detection technology - to defend against the latest attacks using up-to-date intelligence about malware. This platform includes a system of highly instrumented virtual machines to simulate what actual users would experience when visiting a particular web page or viewing a specific online ad.

History
The company was founded by former Google personnel Neil Daswani and Shariq Rizvi, and former McKinsey strategy consultant Ameet Ranadive.

Dasient was named by Network World as one of ten startups to watch in 2010.

The company received seed funding from Mike Maples, ex-Verisign CEO Stratton Sclavos, and ex-3Com/Palm chairman Eric Benhamou. In February 2011, it was announced that Google Ventures invested in Dasient.

Dasient was acquired by Twitter in January 2012.

References

External links 
 

2008 establishments in California
Companies based in Sunnyvale, California
Software companies established in 2008
Computer security companies
GV companies
Twitter, Inc. acquisitions
2012 mergers and acquisitions